Inder is a salt lake in Inder District, Atyrau Region, Kazakhstan.

The mineral Inderite and the plant Eremurus inderiensis were named after the lake.

Geography
Inder an endorheic lake in the northern part of the Caspian Lowland. The southern foothills of the Inder Mountains rise above the northern and northeastern lakeshores. The lake is very shallow.

There are no rivers flowing into the lake nor out of it. Inder is fed mainly by groundwater.
The salt of the lake is of high quality. It contains potassium, bromine and boron. Up to 2021 Inder lake is recognized as the Type locality for seven minerals: Hydroboracite, Inderborite, Inderite, Kurgantaite, Kurnakovite, Preobrazhenskite and Volkovskite.

See also
List of lakes of Kazakhstan

References

External links

Lakes of Kazakhstan
Endorheic lakes of Asia
Atyrau Region
Caspian Depression